Doug Senior (born January 4, 1941) is a Canadian former professional ice hockey player.

Career 
Senior played junior hockey with the TPT Petes of the Ontario Hockey Association, turning professional in 1961 with the Hull-Ottawa Canadiens of the Eastern Professional Hockey League. He went on to play nine seasons of professional hockey, winning the 1964 Adams Cup with the Omaha Knights in the Central Professional Hockey League's inaugural season and playing parts of five seasons in the American Hockey League.

References

1941 births
Living people
Canadian ice hockey left wingers
Cleveland Barons (1937–1973) players
Ice hockey people from Ontario
Memphis South Stars players
Omaha Knights (CHL) players
Peterborough Petes (ice hockey) players
Providence Reds players
Quebec Aces (AHL) players
San Francisco Seals (ice hockey) players
Sportspeople from Kingston, Ontario